Tan Sri Dr. S. Subramaniam s/o. K. V. Sathasivam (born 1 April 1953) is a Malaysian politician who served as Minister of Health from May 2013 to May 2018, Minister of Human Resources from March 2008 to May 2013, Parliamentary Secretary in the Ministry of Human Resources from 2004 to 2008 and Member of Parliament (MP) for Segamat from March 2004 to May 2018. He is a member and served as 9th President of the Malaysian Indian Congress (MIC), a component party of the ruling Barisan Nasional (BN) coalition, in acting capacity from June 2013 to June 2015 and in official capacity from June 2015 to July 2018. He was one of the only two ministers of Indian ethnicity and one of only three MIC candidates who managed to retain their federal seats in the 2008 general elections.

Early life and education

Subramaniam was born on 1 April 1953 to Sathasivam, an assistant registrar of trade unions. He received his early education at the Penang Free School. He graduated with a Bachelor of Medicine and Bachelor of Surgery degree from the National University of Singapore (NUS) in 1978. Upon graduation from the NUS, Subramaniam immediately returned to Malaysia to serve in the Ministry of Health at the District Hospital in Taiping, Perak. Like so many others who toil in public service, he too did his rounds moving from Taiping, Perak to Tangkak in Johor and then Malacca, where he finally settled into his own private practice in 1985.

Subramaniam is a trained and accomplished dermatologist. He furthered his medical practice with a focus on Dermatology, firstly obtaining the Diploma in Dermatology (with distinction) from the University of Wales (UK) in 1994 and Membership of the Royal College of Physicians (MRCP) in Ireland in 1998. His leadership in the medical community is also reflected by his election as the President of the Malacca Branch of the Malaysian Medical Association (1992 to 1994).

Subramaniam is married to Dr. S. Umarani.

Ministerial career

Minister of Health 

After the 2013 election, Subramaniam became the Minister for Health. This brings him back to the Ministry where he first served as a house officer, nominating preventive health and public awareness of health issues as priorities. Since his appointment as Minister of Health, he has tirelessly crossed the country and indeed the world, to formulate a health transformation plan to address the country's challenges and needs. He is cognizant of the many health issues that affect nations in transition. His focus is mainly on increasing public awareness on health issues, especially early detection and prevention of diseases).

Over the years since he was appointed as Health Minister, he has shown his tremendous support in oral health in Malaysia particularly in highlighting the importance of integrating oral health promotion into the general health. His countless contributions in supporting many oral health related events locally and internationally were highly respected among the dental fraternity.

Subramaniam has always give his best to endure the ministry's good, healthy relations with the health professional groups so that the close cooperation would contribute to improved health levels in Malaysia. As a medical doctor for almost 30 years before, Subramaniam had vast experience in the medical field and related issues. With his excellent leadership and exceptional orator skills, he will certainly lead the Ministry of Health to greater heights as well as attain its cherished vision of a nation working together for better health.

National Level Blood Donor Day Award
Subramaniam has done so many events and projects over the years. One of that is the National Level Blood Donation Day Celebration and Celebration Night 2017. The Minister of Health took advantage of the Health Ministry and the Malaysian government to thank the blood donors who had volunteered repeatedly for their sacrifices to assist in fulfilling the agenda of the National Blood Center. Honestly, in Malaysia, blood donation is 100% voluntarily without expecting any reward. He also appreciate certain parties such as the National Armed Forces who became a strong reserve and also women who are now actively involved in blood donation activities. Based on National Blood Center data, in 2016, a total of 693608 blood bags were received by transfusion medical services, of which 68.1% were blood donated and the rest (31.9%) were new blood donors. The Honorable also urges those who have never donated blood to participate and become blood donor replacements. The projection showed a significant increase of 30% among women who came forward to donate blood and this was a positive sign. He also recounted the Whole Malaysian Stock Exchange or "Blood Stock System" that serves to manage blood stocks and identify areas where blood stocks are scarce so stocks from other centers can be channeled to areas where there is a need. By monitoring this center, blood stocks in Malaysia will always be enough to meet the needs of the population.

International Medical Device Conference 2017 
The International Medical Device Conference 2017 was officiated by Subramaniam . This conference was to provide a forum for global medical devices regulators, healthcare institutions, healthcare service providers, research institutes, conformity assessment bodies, training bodies, medical device testing laboratories and stakeholders to discuss and share experiences on regulations and quality and safety of medical device. The purpose of this Forum is to provide a platform for regulators and stakeholders of the medical device industry worldwide to meet and be updated on current affairs pertaining to the medical device industry. Subramaniam has also involved as one of the speaker in dialogue session during the conference addressing questions and involve in the discussion among the speakers and industry leaders.

Malaysian Healthy Plate with a "Semi-Quarter" 
Subramaniam has taken the initiative to raise awareness and skills of Malaysians on healthy eating habits and thereby reducing the risk of non-communicable diseases related to nutrition. He has organized a Malaysian Healthy Plate with a "Semi-Quarter". The concept of "Quarterly Tribes" is so easy to understand, that the plate portion of a plate is filled with carbohydrate sources such as rice or bread; Quarter dishes are filled with protein sources such as fish, chicken, meat and legumes while half dishes are filled with fruit and vegetables. By practicing this concept, one can avoid obesity problems that will bring various non-infectious diseases that are increasingly contagious among Malaysians. It is hoped that all levels of society will be able to respond to the concept of the "Tribal Tribes" that the Ministry of Health has warned and practiced this concept in daily practice.

Human Resource Minister 
In 2008, Subramaniam was appointed Minister for Human Resources. He served as the Human Resource Minister from 18 March 2008 until 5 May 2013. In that portfolio, he has been addressing issues of unemployment, the plight of estate workers, the challenges of unskilled workers and human resource capacity-building. He said his appointment would benefit low-income groups, especially Indians. He also said issues related to Indians and employment was one of the reasons the MIC had been given the human resources portfolio in the Cabinet and he would seek solutions. He said:

The President of Malaysian Indian Congress (MIC)
Subramaniam has been an acting president for one year from 25 June 2014 to 25 June 2015 first before officially elected until now as the ninth president of Malaysian Indian Congress (MIC).

Malaysian Indian Blueprint 

As MIC president Dr S. Subramaniam has come up with the national blueprint for the Malaysian Indian community, initiated by the Prime Minister Datuk Seri Najib Tun Razak. The brainchild of Prime Minister was the first action plan for Indians covering basic needs such as education, entrepreneurship, housing, employment, documentation, trade and social development. The implementation of this plan is under the 11th Malaysia Plan in which the government gives priority to the Malaysian Indian community, and provides various programmes to cater to their needs. Subramaniam has the idea of this as it was a new initiative to start implementing development plans for the Indian community, especially a new perspective and scope for houses of worship as an effort to bring about transformation to the Indian community. Blueprint focus on four aspects to improve the living standards of the community of Indians. The blueprint especially address the problems of 40 per cent of households (B-40 category) in the next 10 years from now (2017). Those are to identify the basic problems, realizing the potential of every child, improving livelihood and wealth, and social issues. Subramaniam also create a special unit known as the Unit for the Socio-Economic Development of the Indian Community, under the Prime Minister's Department, where it is solely responsible for monitoring and implementing the plan. The special unit will be staffed by civil servants as executors to record the success of the main essence of the plan every year. Another initiative of Subramaniam and Najib Tun Razak is to set up a fund with an allocation of RM500 million to assist small entrepreneurs and improve their economic status as well as identify and register the B40 group for programmes that are suitable for them.

Blueprint seeks to engender the following outcomes for the Malaysian Indian community:
 Improved income and wealth levels, in both absolute and relative terms, particularly among the IB40
 Improved educational attainment, with no discernible inter-ethnic gaps
 An increased sense of inclusion into Malaysia's social fabric among the Malaysian Indian community

Election results

Awards and recognitions
For his many contributions, Subramaniam has received many awards and accolades, among them being the
 Honorary Fellowship of the Faculty of Occupational Medicine of the Royal College of Physicians of Ireland
 Honorary Fellowship of the Academy of Family Physicians of Malaysia and Honorary Fellow of the Academy of Medicine Malaysia
 During the 66th World Health Organization (WHO) Regional Committee Meeting for the Western Pacific Region in Guam, United States in 2016, Subramaniam has been appointed as Vice President of the upcoming 69th World Health Assembly (WHA) in Geneva, Switzerland. The appointment which was made unanimously is indeed an astounding recognition for Malaysia's active role on the global health platform.

Honours
  : 
  Officer of the Order of the Defender of the Realm (KMN) (1998)
  Commander of the Order of Meritorious Service (PJN) (2007)
  Commander of the Order of Loyalty to the Crown of Malaysia (PSM) – Tan Sri (2022)
  :
  Grand Commander of the Order of Malacca (DGSM) - Datuk Seri (2011)

References

External links

  Dr. S.Subramaniam – Official website

 
 

Living people
1953 births
Malaysian people of Indian descent
Malaysian Hindus
Malaysian politicians of Tamil descent
Malaysian dermatologists
Presidents of Malaysian Indian Congress
Government ministers of Malaysia
Health ministers of Malaysia
Members of the Dewan Rakyat
Officers of the Order of the Defender of the Realm
Commanders of the Order of Meritorious Service
21st-century Malaysian politicians
Commanders of the Order of Loyalty to the Crown of Malaysia